The 7mm Remington Ultra Magnum or 7mm RUM is a 7mm rifle cartridge introduced by Remington Arms in 2001.

Overview
The 7mm RUM was created using the .404 Jeffery case which was also used to develop the .375 RUM .300 RUM, and .338 RUM . By necking down the .300 RUM to suit the .284 or 7mm projectile, Remington produced a non-belted case with a head diameter that is somewhat larger than the belt diameter of the original belted numbers. The resulting case has significantly more capacity than any conventional belted magnum. Compared to the 7mm Remington Magnum, top 7mm RUM loads deliver 25% more energy at 300 yards. Such performance demands a price and in this case, that is a large muzzle blast, sharp recoil and short barrel life.

The 7mm Ultra Magnum boasts the largest case of any commercial 7mm cartridge. The 7mm Ultra Magnum (7mmx91) is a different cartridge than the similarly named 7mm Short Action Ultra Magnum cartridge (7mmx71).  The two are not interchangeable.

See also
 List of rifle cartridges
 Table of handgun and rifle cartridges
 7 mm caliber

References

External links

Pistol and rifle cartridges
Remington Ultra Magnum rifle cartridges